Ulrich Johan Wilson (born 5 May 1964) is a Dutch former professional footballer who played as a defender.

Career
Born in Nieuw Nickerie, Suriname, Wilson played in the Netherlands with Twente, Groningen, Volendam and Emmen.

Wilson also played for English side Ipswich Town between December 1987 and April 1988, while on loan from Twente. At Ipswich, Wilson made six appearances in the Football League.

References

1964 births
Living people
Surinamese emigrants to the Netherlands
Association football defenders
Dutch footballers
Dutch expatriate footballers
Expatriate footballers in England
Dutch expatriate sportspeople in England
FC Twente players
Ipswich Town F.C. players
FC Groningen players
FC Volendam players
FC Emmen players
Eredivisie players
Eerste Divisie players
English Football League players